Harold Philip Lambert, FRCP (2 May 1926 – 1 April 2017) was a British medical doctor and professor of medicine, known for his work dealing with infectious diseases and antibiotic therapy. He helped in the development of pyrazinamide as a treatment for tuberculosis and also did some of the earliest research into mescaline.

He trained at Cambridge University and University College Hospital, where as a medical student he witnessed the death of George Orwell from tuberculosis. In 1963 Lambert became consultant physician, and later the first professor of microbial diseases, at St George's, University of London. He was co-editor with Lawrence Paul Garrod and Francis O'Grady of the 4th (1973), 5th, and 6th editions of the important textbook on antibiotic therapy "Antibiotic and Chemotherapy". Lambert was also the co-editor of the 7th edition (1997) with O'Grady, Roger G. Finch, and David Greenwood. Lambert's main research interests were meningitis, respiratory infections, and the optimal use of antibiotics.

In 1955 in Marylebone he married Joan Richley (b. 1928). They had two daughters and a son.

Selected publications
with Robert M. McCune, Floyd M. Feldmann, and Walsh McDermott: 
with Arnold Eley and T. Hargreaves: 
with H. Stern: 
with Mark G. Thomas and Keith Redhead: 
 with Robert S. Heyderman, I. O'Sullivan, J. M. Stuart, B. L. Taylor, and R. A. Wall:

References

External links
Harold Lambert telling his life story at Web of Stories
Harold Lambert's obituary
Harold Lambert at the Royal College of Physicians

1926 births
2017 deaths
20th-century British medical doctors
21st-century British medical doctors
Fellows of the Royal College of Physicians
Physicians of St George's Hospital